Gurshabad Singh Kular (born 24 August 1989) is an Indian film actor and playback singer known for his work predominantly in Punjabi cinema and music industry. After completing his junior high school from a local school, he attended Khalsa College, Amritsar for his undergraduate and went on to study at Guru Nanak Dev University, Amritsar where he completed his Master of Arts program in Music.

Life and career 

In September 2015, Gurshabad debuted as a singer with Vaar Bhagat Singh (dedicated to Shaheed Bhagat Singh), a duo collaboration along with Ammy Virk. In the same year, Gurshabad gave his first film appearance in a box-office success Angrej, in which Amrinder Gill played the lead role. After singing singles including Milne Di Rutt (ਮਿਲਣੇ ਦੀ ਰੁੱਤ) (2016), Geetkariyan (ਗੀਤਕਾਰੀਆਂ) (2016), and Tarakiyaan (ਤਰੱਕੀਆਂ) (2017), Gurshabad commenced his playback singing career with a track titled Rajya (ਰਾਜਿਆ) penned by Harman Jeet in the film Sarvann (2017) produced by Priyanka Chopra, Madhu Chopra and Deepshikha Deshmukh.

Discography

Singles

References  

Living people
Indian film actors
Indian playback singers
1989 births